Lomas (Spanish for "hills"), also called fog oases and mist oases, are areas of fog-watered vegetation in the coastal desert of Peru and northern Chile.

Lomas may also refer to:

Places
 Las Lomas (disambiguation)

Argentina
 Lomas de Zamora, Buenos Aires Province
 Lomas de Zamora Partido, Buenos Aires Province
 Lomas del Mirador, Buenos Aires Province
 Tres Lomas, Buenos Aires Province
 Tres Lomas Partido, Buenos Aires Province

Chile
 Lomas, fog oases of the desert 
 Lomas Bay, Chile
  
Costa Rica
 Lomas de Barbudal Biological Reserve

Ecuador
 Lomas de Sargentillo, Guayas

Mexico
 Lomas Taurinas, Tijuana, Mexico
 Lomas Verdes, Mexico
 Lomas de Chapultepec, a residential district in Mexico City

Peru
 Lomas. fog oases of the desert
 Lomas de Lachay, a national reserve in Lima

Puerto Rico
 Lomas, Canóvanas, Puerto Rico, a barrio
 Lomas, Juana Díaz, Puerto Rico, a barrio
 Lomas, Naranjito, Puerto Rico, a barrio

Spain
 Lomas, Palencia, Spain

United States
 Ranchitos Las Lomas, Texas

People
 Lomas (surname)
 Lomas Brown (born 1963), American football offensive tackle
 Linton Lomas Barrett (1904–1972), American educator and diplomat

Other uses
 Lomas Athletic Club, Argentine sports club
 Lomas & Nettleton Building (now Franklin Lofts), a low-rise building in Houston, Texas generally regarded as the first skyscraper in the city

See also
 Lomax (disambiguation)
 Loomis (disambiguation)